Howardsville may refer to:
Howardsville, Colorado
Howardsville, New Jersey
Howardsville, Albemarle County, Virginia
Howardsville, Loudoun County, Virginia